Arbatan (also Romanized as Arbaţān) is a village in Zolbin Rural District, Yamchi District, Marand County, East Azerbaijan Province, Iran. At the 2006 census, its population was 1,582, in 336 families.

Name 
According to Vladimir Minorsky, the name "Arbatan" is derived from the Mongolian language and means "chief of ten men".

References 

Populated places in Marand County